Law Cheuk Him (born 26 February 1994) is a Hong Kong badminton player. He won the 2021 Bahrain International Challenge mixed doubles title with Yeung Nga Ting.

Early life 
Before graduating, Law studied at the S.T.F.A. Wu Siu Kui Memorial Primary School and the Yan Oi Tong Tin Ka Ping Secondary School in Tuen Mun District, Hong Kong.

Career 
Law represented Hong Kong in the 2014 Asian Games men's team event. In 2015, he reached the semifinals of the Chinese Taipei Masters Grand Prix with partner Chan Tsz Kit.

Law later partnered with World Championship bronze medalist Lee Chun Hei and they both entered a career-high ranking of 26 in men's doubles in 2017. Law and Lee were also runners-up at the 2022 Slovak Open. He also plays mixed doubles and partners with Yeung Nga Ting. They got into two consecutive tournament finals in Bahrain and won their first title there.

Achievements

BWF International Challenge/Series (1 title, 2 runners-up) 
Men's doubles

Mixed doubles

  BWF International Challenge tournament
  BWF International Series tournament
  BWF Future Series tournament

References

External links 
 

1994 births
Living people
Hong Kong male badminton players
Badminton players at the 2014 Asian Games
Asian Games competitors for Hong Kong